Sir Willie Morris  (1919 – 13 April 1982) was a British diplomat from Yorkshire. He joined the Foreign Office in 1947 and retired in 1979.

Career
His first overseas assignment took him to Cairo in 1948 as a second secretary. He advanced to first secretary in the Foreign Office in 1951. From 1955 to 1960, he was first secretary in the British Embassy in Washington, D.C. There he met his wife, Ghislaine Margaret Trammell. He spent most of his career in the Middle East, and served as the UK ambassador to Saudi Arabia (1968–1972), Ethiopia (1972–1975) and Egypt (1975–1979). 

Morris insisted on the importance of strong ties between the United States and the Arab World, and called on Israel to recognize a Palestinian state in the West Bank. A resident of Oxford, he died there, aged 63, after a brief illness. He was survived by his wife, three sons, four siblings, and extended family.

References
General

Specific

1919 births
1982 deaths
People educated at Batley Grammar School
Alumni of St John's College, Oxford
Ambassadors of the United Kingdom to Ethiopia
Ambassadors of the United Kingdom to Egypt
Ambassadors of the United Kingdom to Saudi Arabia
Knights Commander of the Order of St Michael and St George
People from Yorkshire
Members of HM Diplomatic Service
20th-century British diplomats